Pileh Kuh (also Romanized as Pīleh Kūh; also known as Pīlkūh) is a village in Kuhdasht-e Sharqi Rural District, in the Central District of Miandorud County, Mazandaran Province, Iran. At the 2006 census, its population was 397, in 86 families.

References 

Populated places in Miandorud County